Neptunitalea is a genus of bacteria from the family of Flavobacteriaceae with one known species (Neptunitalea chrysea).

References

Flavobacteria
Bacteria genera
Monotypic bacteria genera
Taxa described in 2015